Sordevolo is a comune (municipality) in the Province of Biella in the Italian region Piedmont, located about  northeast of Turin and about  west of Biella.

Sordevolo borders the following municipalities: Biella, Graglia, Muzzano, Occhieppo Superiore, Pollone, Lillianes.
The village is located in the Elvo Valley, a natural land at the foot of the Alps, in the middle of a religious and cultural area. Sordevolo can be considered a place of faith and popular devotion, whose widest expressions are the seven churches (and up to the last century three brotherhoods, too), and the Passion Play, while in the past were the Last Judgement Play in the 19th century and St. Augustine drama, were performed in 1777. Sordevolo is also historically bound to the textile industry that influenced the life of the village for centuries.

La Passione

Every five years, La Passione (the Passion Play) is organized by the Associazione Teatro Popolare di Sordevolo, involving the community of Sordevolo. The play has been held since 1816 and involves approximately 400 actors and 300 crew. Forty shows are performed over 100 days.

The performance in 2015 was patroned by the Ministry of Cultural Heritage and Activities from the Papal Committee for the Cultural Heritage of the Church.

The script is a text in verses that dates to the end of the 15th century, written by Giuliano Dati, chaplain of the church of the Forty Saints Martyrs in Trastevere, Rome. In 1539 during the Reformation, Pope Paul III banned the play. A copy of the original roman manuscript printed in Turin in 1728, now exhibited and preserved in the Museum of the Passion, inside the Church of Santa Marta, one of the churches of the village.

References

Cities and towns in Piedmont